Viktória Soós (formerly Viktória Rédei-Soós; born 28 July 1985) is a retired Hungarian handballer.

She made her international debut on 23 April 2011 against the Netherlands. She retired from handball in June 2017, but returned in January 2019.

Personal life 
Her first husband was István Rédei, Hungarian handballer. Her second husband is Gergely Jáky-Szabó, their son is Gergő.

Achievements
Nemzeti Bajnokság I:
Winner: 2007, 2013, 2014, 2015
Bronze Medalist: 2008, 2009, 2010
Magyar Kupa:
Winner: 2013, 2014
Finalist: 2009, 2015
EHF Champions League:
Winner: 2013, 2014
EHF Cup:
Semifinalist: 2006
EHF Cup Winners' Cup:
Semifinalist: 2007, 2015
European Championship:
Bronze Medalist: 2012

References

External links

 Career statistics at Worldhandball
 

1985 births
Living people
Sportspeople from Debrecen
Hungarian female handball players
Expatriate handball players
Hungarian expatriate sportspeople in Austria
Győri Audi ETO KC players